Dichomeris holomela is a moth in the family Gelechiidae. It was described by Oswald Bertram Lower in 1897. It is found in Australia, where it has been recorded from New South Wales, Western Australia, the Northern Territory and Queensland.

The forewings are dark fuscous, faintly purplish tinged. The stigmata are faintly darker, hardly traceable. The hindwings are fuscous, darker posteriorly.

References

Moths described in 1897
holomela